is a Japanese actor represented by TakeOff and Four Springs.

As a child actor, Hamada played the role of Sakamoto Ryōma as a child in Ryōmaden and Hiroshi Ichikawa in Kaibutsu-kun. He won the 2010 Gold Dream Award in October 2010.

Biography
Hamada was born in Chiba Prefecture. His hobbies and skills are playing soccer, collecting Lego, playing shogi and kendama, and impersonating Gachapin. Hamada likes tuna, according to a May 5, 2011 appearance in Hanamaru Market. He likes to study Chinese kanji. He can write difficult words such as "Uttōshī" and "Gōhōrairaku". In late August 2011, Hamada appeared with Masaharu Fukuyama in a Dunlop advertisement. They both played the role of Sakamoto Ryōma in Ryōmaden. He has a younger brother who is one year younger than him.

Filmography

TV series

Variety

Anime

Documentaries

Films

Advertisements

Stage

Music videos

Photobooks

Events

References

External links
 
 

Japanese male child actors
2000 births
Living people
Actors from Chiba Prefecture
21st-century Japanese male actors